Tsundur is a village in Bapatla district of the Indian state of Andhra Pradesh. It is the mandal headquarters of Tsundur mandal in Bapatla revenue division.

Demographics 

The total population constitute,  males,  females and  children, in the age group of 0–6 years. The average literacy rate stands at 69.94% with  literates, significantly lower than the national average of 73.00%.

Dalit massacre 

The village witnessed killing 8 dalits on 6 August 1991, when a mob of over 300 people, composed of mainly upper caste chased down the victims along the bund of an irrigation canal. This happened after police department asked locals to go aggressive against large number of eve teasing outsiders entering village. In the trial which was concluded, 21 people were sentenced to life imprisonment and 35 others to a year of rigorous imprisonment and a penalty of Rs. 2,000 each, on 31 July 2007, by special judge established for the Purpose under SC, STs Atrocities (Prevention) Act.

See also 
Villages in Tsundur mandal
Tsundur Massacre

References 

Villages in Guntur district
Mandal headquarters in Guntur district